Jackson Local Schools is a school district located in Jackson Township, Stark County, Ohio, United States.

The district includes: four elementary schools, one middle school and one high school. The district's mascot are the Polar Bears. U.S. News & World Report consistently ranks Jackson High School as one of the top 9-12 educational institutions in Ohio and among the top 6% in the country. BackgroundCheck.org ranked the Jackson Local School District the top district in Ohio.

Jackson Local Schools' superintendent is Chris DiLoreto who has held said position since August 2011.

Schools

Elementary schools (K-5)
 Amherst Elementary School
 Lake Cable Elementary School
 Sauder Elementary School
 Strausser Elementary School

Middle school (6-8)
 Jackson Memorial Middle School

High school (9-12)
 Jackson High School

Notes

External links
 Official Site

School districts in Stark County, Ohio